Ray Dieringer is a former head basketball coach at Cleveland State University. He coached at Cleveland State from 1969 through 1983. He graduated from University of Dayton in 1956. He was inducted into the Cleveland State Vikings hall of fame in 1998.

Head coaching record

References

Basketball coaches from Ohio
Basketball players from Ohio
Cleveland State Vikings men's basketball coaches
Dayton Flyers men's basketball players
Point guards
Year of birth missing (living people)
Living people